Mikail Maden (born 17 January 2002) is a Norwegian footballer who plays as a midfielder.

Career
Maden made his professional debut for Schalke 04 in the Bundesliga on 13 March 2021, coming on as a substitute in the 85th minute for Amine Harit against VfL Wolfsburg. The away match finished as a 0–5 loss.

References

External links
 
 
 
 
 

2002 births
Living people
Footballers from Bergen
Norwegian footballers
Norway youth international footballers
Norwegian expatriate footballers
Norwegian expatriate sportspeople in Germany
Expatriate footballers in Germany
Association football midfielders
SK Brann players
FC Schalke 04 players
FC Schalke 04 II players
Norwegian Third Division players
Bundesliga players